Vincenzo Serafino (died 1615) was a Roman Catholic prelate who served as Bishop of Teano (1588–1615).

Biography
On 3 October 1588, Vincenzo Serafino was appointed during the papacy of Pope Gregory XIII as Bishop of Teano.
On 7 December 1588, he was consecrated bishop by Girolamo Bernerio, Bishop of Ascoli Piceno, with Fabio Biondi (bishop), Titular Patriarch of Jerusalem, and Giambattista de Benedictis, Bishop of Penne e Atri, serving as co-consecrators. He served as Bishop of Teano until his death in 1615 in Ascoli Piceno, Italy.

References

External links and additional sources
 (for Chronology of Bishops) 
 (for Chronology of Bishops) 

16th-century Italian Roman Catholic bishops
17th-century Italian Roman Catholic bishops
Bishops appointed by Pope Gregory XIII
1615 deaths